Darya Pachabut (born 31 December 1994) is a Belarusian weightlifter.

Career
Pachabut won the silver medal at the 2011 European Junior Weightlifting Championships in the –63 kg category. The following year, Pachabut finished first but she was later disqualified after returning a positive doping test for Stanozolol. As a result of the doping violation, Pachabut was suspended for 2 years by the International Weightlifting Federation.

After returning to competition following her suspension, Pachabut won the bronze medal at the 2015 European Weightlifting Championships in the –75 kg category, and then the silver medal at the 2016 European Weightlifting Championships in the –69 kg category. Pachabut competed at the 2016 Summer Olympics in the –69 kg event, where she finished 6th.

References

1994 births
Living people
Belarusian sportspeople in doping cases
Doping cases in weightlifting
Belarusian female weightlifters
Olympic weightlifters of Belarus
Weightlifters at the 2016 Summer Olympics
European Weightlifting Championships medalists
20th-century Belarusian women
21st-century Belarusian women